The following is a list of current XFL team rosters:

Arlington Renegades

DC Defenders

Houston Roughnecks

Orlando Guardians

San Antonio Brahmas

Seattle Sea Dragons

St. Louis BattleHawks

Vegas Vipers

See also
List of current AFC team rosters
List of current NFC team rosters
List of current CFL team rosters
List of current USFL team rosters
List of current Indoor Football League team rosters
List of current Champions Indoor Football team rosters
List of current National Arena League team rosters

XFL (2020)
XFL